http://www.kzkzfm.com

KZKZ-FM (106.3 FM, "Spirit FM 106.3") is a radio station licensed to serve Greenwood, Arkansas, United States. The station is owned by Family Communications, Inc. It airs a Christian Contemporary music format.

The station was assigned the KZKZ-FM call letters by the Federal Communications Commission on August 7, 1989.

References

External links
KZKZ-FM official website

Contemporary Christian radio stations in the United States
Sebastian County, Arkansas
Radio stations established in 1989
ZKZ-FM